Ilsur Raisovich Metshin (born April 24, 1969) is a Russian politician of Tatar descent. He was born in Nizhnekamsk. Since 1993 he worked in Kazan as a politician. Since 1998 he was Mayor of Nizhnekamsk and Nizhnekamsky District and chairman of the Nizhnekamsk Council. Since 2005 November 17 he is the Mayor of Kazan, replacing Kamil Iskhakov. On September 4, 2015 he was selected as the new president of FC Rubin Kazan.

He was elected chairman of the United Nations Advisory Committee of Local Authorities at UCLG World Congress 2019 in Durban. On November 17, 2021 he was elected Governing President of the United Cities and Local Governments at 2021 UCLG World Council in Barcelona.

References

External links 

 Official personal website

1969 births
Living people
Politicians from Kazan
Tatar people of Russia